= Leña Pizza and Bagels =

Restaurant in Cleveland, Mississippi, U.S.

- Interactive map of Leña Pizza and Bagels

Restaurant information
- Location: 331 Cotton Row, Cleveland, Mississippi, 38732, United States
- Coordinates: 33°44′50″N 90°43′19″W

Leña Pizza and Bagels is a restaurant in Cleveland, Mississippi. It was included in The New York Times's 2024 list of the 22 best pizzerias in the U.S.
